(born October 6, 1979) is a Japanese softball player who won two medals for Japan in the Olympic Games. In 2000 she played in 2nd base, where she won the silver medal for the team. In 2004 she played as a shortstop, in which her team received a bronze medal.

References

Japanese softball players
Living people
Softball players at the 2000 Summer Olympics
Olympic softball players of Japan
Olympic silver medalists for Japan
Softball players at the 2004 Summer Olympics
Olympic bronze medalists for Japan
1979 births
Olympic medalists in softball
Asian Games medalists in softball
Medalists at the 2004 Summer Olympics
Softball players at the 2006 Asian Games
Softball players at the 2002 Asian Games
Medalists at the 2002 Asian Games
Medalists at the 2006 Asian Games
Asian Games gold medalists for Japan
21st-century Japanese women